L'insegnante viene a casa (internationally released as The School Teacher in the House) is a 1978 commedia sexy all'italiana directed by Michele Massimo Tarantini. The film is the third chapter in the "Schoolteacher" film series and the last starred by Edwige Fenech in the title role.

Cast 
 Edwige Fenech: Luisa De Dominicis
 Renzo Montagnani: Ferdinando Bonci Marinotti
 Lino Banfi: Amedeo
 Alvaro Vitali: Ottavio 
 Carlo Sposito: Colonel Marullo
 Clara Colosimo: Colonel Marullo's wife

References

External links
 

1978 films
Commedia sexy all'italiana
Insegnante films
Films directed by Michele Massimo Tarantini
1970s sex comedy films
1978 comedy films
1970s Italian films